Behavioral economics studies the effects of psychological, cognitive, emotional, cultural and social factors on the decisions of individuals or institutions, such as how those decisions vary from those implied by classical economic theory.

Behavioral economics is primarily concerned with the bounds of rationality of economic agents. Behavioral models typically integrate insights from psychology, neuroscience and microeconomic theory. The study of behavioral economics includes how market decisions are made and the mechanisms that drive public opinion.

The concepts used in behavioral economics today can be traced back to 18th-century economists, such as Adam Smith, who deliberated how the economic behavior of individuals could be influenced by their desires.

The status of behavioral economics as a subfield of economics is a fairly recent development; the breakthroughs that laid the foundation for it were published through the last three decades of the 20th century. Behavioral economics is still growing as a field, being used increasingly in research and in teaching.

History 

Early Neoclassical economists included psychological reasoning in much of their writing, though psychology at the time was not a recognized field of study. In The Theory of Moral Sentiments, Adam Smith wrote on concepts later popularized by modern Behavioral Economic theory, such as loss aversion. Jeremy Benthham, another Neoclassical economist in the 1700s conceptualized utility as a product of psychology. Other Neoclassical economists who incorporated psychological explanations in their works included Francis Edgeworth, Vilfredo Pareto and Irving Fisher.

A rejection and elimination of psychology from economics by the Neoclassical school in the early 1900s brought on a period defined by a reliance on empiricism. There was a lack of confidence in hedonic theories, which saw pursuance of maximum benefit as an essential aspect in understanding human economic behavior. Hedonic analysis had shown little success in predicting human behavior, leading many to question its accuracy.

There was also a fear among economists that the involvement of psychology in shaping economic models was inordinate and a departure from contemporary Neoclassical principles. They feared that an increased emphasis on psychology would undermine the mathematic components of the field. William Peter Hamilton, Wall Street Journal editor from 1907 to 1929, wrote in The Stock Market Barometer: "We have meddled so disastrously with the law of supply and demand that we cannot bring ourselves to the radical step of letting it alone."

To boost the ability of economics to predict accurately, economists started looking to tangible phenomena rather than theories based on human psychology. Psychology was seen as unreliable to many of these economists as it was a new field, not regarded as sufficiently scientific. Though a number of scholars expressed concern towards the positivism within economics, models of study dependent on psychological insights became rare. Economists instead conceptualized humans as purely rational and self-interested decision makers, illustrated in the concept of homo economicus.

The re-emergence of psychology within economics that allowed for the spread of behavioral economics has been associated with the cognitive revolution. In the 1960s, cognitive psychology began to shed more light on the brain as an information processing device (in contrast to behaviorist models). Psychologists in this field, such as Ward Edwards, Amos Tversky and Daniel Kahneman began to compare their cognitive models of decision-making under risk and uncertainty to economic models of rational behavior. These developments spurred economists to reconsider how psychology could be applied to economic models and theories. Concurrently, the Expected utility hypothesis and discounted utility models began to gain acceptance. In challenging the accuracy of generic utility, these concepts established a practice foundational in behavioral economics: Building on standard models by applying psychological knowledge.

Mathematical psychology reflects a longstanding interest in preference transitivity and the measurement of utility.

Development of Behavioral Economics 
In 2017, Niels Geiger, a lecturer in economics at the University of Hohenheim conducted an investigation into the proliferation of behavioral economics. Geiger's research looked at studies that had quantified the frequency of references to terms specific to behavioral economics, and how often influential papers in behavioral economics were cited in journals on economics. The quantitative study found that there was a significant spread in behavioral economics after Kahneman and Tversky's work in the 1990s and into the 2000s.

Bounded rationality 

Bounded rationality is the idea that when individuals make decisions, their rationality is limited by the tractability of the decision problem, their cognitive limitations and the time available. Decision-makers in this view act as satisficers, seeking a satisfactory solution rather than an optimal one.

Herbert A. Simon proposed bounded rationality as an alternative basis for the mathematical modeling of decision-making. It complements "rationality as optimization", which views decision-making as a fully rational process of finding an optimal choice given the information available. Simon used the analogy of a pair of scissors, where one blade represents human cognitive limitations and the other the "structures of the environment", illustrating how minds compensate for limited resources by exploiting known structural regularity in the environment. Bounded rationality implicates the idea that humans take shortcuts that may lead to suboptimal decision-making. Behavioral economists engage in mapping the decision shortcuts that agents use in order to help increase the effectiveness of human decision-making. Bounded rationality finds that actors do not assess all available options appropriately, in order to save on search and deliberation costs. As such decisions are not always made in the sense of greatest self-reward as limited information is available. Instead agents shall choose to settle for an acceptable solution. One treatment of this idea comes from Cass Sunstein and Richard Thaler's Nudge. Sunstein and Thaler recommend that choice architectures are modified in light of human agents' bounded rationality. A widely cited proposal from Sunstein and Thaler urges that healthier food be placed at sight level in order to increase the likelihood that a person will opt for that choice instead of less healthy option. Some critics of Nudge have lodged attacks that modifying choice architectures will lead to people becoming worse decision-makers.

Prospect theory 

In 1979, Kahneman and Tversky published Prospect Theory: An Analysis of Decision Under Risk, that used cognitive psychology to explain various divergences of economic decision making from neo-classical theory. Kahneman and Tversky utilising prospect theory determined three generalisations; gains are treated differently than losses, outcomes received with certainty are overweighed relative to uncertain outcomes and the structure of the problem may affect choices. These arguments were proven in part by altering a survey question so that it was no longer a case of achieving gains but averting losses and the majority of respondents altered their answers accordingly. In essence proving that emotions such as fear of loss, or greed can alter decisions, indicating the presence of an irrational decision-making process. Prospect theory has two stages: an editing stage and an evaluation stage. In the editing stage, risky situations are simplified using various heuristics. In the evaluation phase, risky alternatives are evaluated using various psychological principles that include:

Reference dependence: When evaluating outcomes, the decision maker considers a "reference level". Outcomes are then compared to the reference point and classified as "gains" if greater than the reference point and "losses" if less than the reference point.
 Loss aversion: Losses are avoided more than equivalent gains are sought. In their 1992 paper, Kahneman and Tversky found the median coefficient of loss aversion to be about 2.25, i.e., losses hurt about 2.25 times more than equivalent gains reward.
 Non-linear probability weighting: Decision makers overweigh small probabilities and underweigh large probabilities—this gives rise to the inverse-S shaped "probability weighting function".
 Diminishing sensitivity to gains and losses: As the size of the gains and losses relative to the reference point increase in absolute value, the marginal effect on the decision maker's utility or satisfaction falls.

Prospect theory is able to explain everything that the two main existing decision theories—expected utility theory and rank dependent utility theory—can explain. Further, prospect theory has been used to explain phenomena that existing decision theories have great difficulty in explaining. These include backward bending labor supply curves, asymmetric price elasticities, tax evasion and co-movement of stock prices and consumption.

In 1992, in the Journal of Risk and Uncertainty, Kahneman and Tversky gave a revised account of prospect theory that they called cumulative prospect theory. The new theory eliminated the editing phase in prospect theory and focused just on the evaluation phase. Its main feature was that it allowed for non-linear probability weighting in a cumulative manner, which was originally suggested in John Quiggin's rank-dependent utility theory. Psychological traits such as overconfidence, projection bias, and the effects of limited attention are now part of the theory. Other developments include a conference at the University of Chicago, a special behavioral economics edition of the Quarterly Journal of Economics ("In Memory of Amos Tversky"), and Kahneman's 2002 Nobel Prize for having "integrated insights from psychological research into economic science, especially concerning human judgment and decision-making under uncertainty."

A further argument of Behavioural Economics relates to the impact of the individual's cognitive limitations as a factor in limiting the rationality of people's decisions. Sloan first argued this in his paper 'Bounded Rationality' where he stated that our cognitive limitations are somewhat the consequence of our limited ability to foresee the future, hampering the rationality of decision. Daniel Kahneman further expanded upon the effect cognitive ability and processes have on decision making in his book Thinking, Fast and Slow Kahneman delved into two forms of thought, fast thinking which he considered "operates automatically and quickly, with little or no effort and no sense of voluntary control". Conversely, slow thinking is the allocation of cognitive ability, choice and concentration. Fast thinking utilises heuristics, which is a decision-making process that undertakes shortcuts, and rules of thumb to provide an immediate but often irrational and imperfect solution. Kahneman proposed that the result of the shortcuts is the occurrence of a number of biases such as hindsight bias, confirmation bias and outcome bias among others. A key example of fast thinking and the resultant irrational decisions is the 2008 financial crisis.

Nudge theory 

Nudge is a concept in behavioral science, political theory and economics which proposes positive reinforcement and indirect suggestions as ways to influence the behavior and decision making of groups or individuals—in other words, it's "a way to manipulate people's choices to lead them to make specific decisions".

Nudging contrasts with other ways to achieve compliance, such as education, legislation or enforcement. The concept has influenced British and American politicians. Several nudge units exist around the world at the national level (UK, Germany, Japan and others) as well as at the international level (OECD, World Bank, UN).

The first formulation of the term and associated principles was developed in cybernetics by James Wilk before 1995 and described by Brunel University academic D. J. Stewart as "the art of the nudge" (sometimes referred to as micronudges). It also drew on methodological influences from clinical psychotherapy tracing back to Gregory Bateson, including contributions from Milton Erickson, Watzlawick, Weakland and Fisch, and Bill O'Hanlon. In this variant, the nudge is a microtargeted design geared towards a specific group of people, irrespective of the scale of intended intervention.

In 2008, Richard Thaler and Cass Sunstein's book Nudge: Improving Decisions About Health, Wealth, and Happiness brought nudge theory to prominence. It also gained a following among US and UK politicians, in the private sector and in public health. The authors refer to influencing behavior without coercion as libertarian paternalism and the influencers as choice architects.  Thaler and Sunstein defined their concept as:

In this form, drawing on behavioral economics, the nudge is more generally applied to influence behavior.

One of the most frequently cited examples of a nudge is the etching of the image of a housefly into the men's room urinals at Amsterdam's Schiphol Airport, which is intended to "improve the aim".

Nudging techniques aim to capitalise on the judgemental heuristics of people. In other words, a nudge alters the environment so that when heuristic, or System 1, decision-making is used, the resulting choice will be the most positive or desired outcome. An example of such a nudge is switching the placement of junk food in a store, so that fruit and other healthy options are located next to the cash register, while junk food is relocated to another part of the store.

In 2008, the United States appointed Sunstein, who helped develop the theory, as administrator of the Office of Information and Regulatory Affairs.

Notable applications of nudge theory include the formation of the British Behavioural Insights Team in 2010. It is often called the "Nudge Unit", at the British Cabinet Office, headed by David Halpern. In addition, the Penn Medicine Nudge Unit is the world's first behavioral design team embedded within a health system.

Both Prime Minister David Cameron and President Barack Obama sought to employ nudge theory to advance domestic policy goals during their terms.

In Australia, the government of New South Wales established a Behavioural Insights community of practice.

Nudge theory has also been applied to business management and corporate culture, such as in relation to health, safety and environment (HSE) and human resources. Regarding its application to HSE, one of the primary goals of nudge is to achieve a "zero accident culture".

Leading Silicon Valley companies are forerunners in applying nudge theory in a corporate setting. These companies are using nudges in various forms to increase the productivity and happiness of employees. Recently, further companies are gaining interest in using what is called "nudge management" to improve the productivity of their white-collar workers.

Behavioral insights and nudges are currently used in many countries around the world.

Criticisms 

Citing the example of restaurant hygiene ratings to 'nudge' consumers towards food safety, it has been argued that mere public disclosure of ratings is not always sufficient to ensure public health safety, with strong variance in effectiveness from country to country.

Tammy Boyce, from public health foundation The King's Fund, has said: "We need to move away from short-term, politically motivated initiatives such as the 'nudging people' idea, which is not based on any good evidence and doesn't help people make long-term behaviour changes."

Cass Sunstein has responded to critiques at length in his The Ethics of Influence making the case in favor of nudging against charges that nudges diminish autonomy, threaten dignity, violate liberties, or reduce welfare. Ethicists have debated this rigorously. These charges have been made by various participants in the debate from Bovens  to Goodwin. Wilkinson for example charges nudges for being manipulative, while others such as Yeung question their scientific credibility.

Some, such as Hausman & Welch have inquired whether nudging should be permissible on grounds of (distributive) justice; Lepenies & Malecka have questioned whether nudges are compatible with the rule of law. Similarly, legal scholars have discussed the role of nudges and the law.

Behavioral economists such as Bob Sugden have pointed out that the underlying normative benchmark of nudging is still homo economicus, despite the proponents' claim to the contrary.

It has been remarked that nudging is also a euphemism for psychological manipulation as practiced in social engineering.

There exists an anticipation and, simultaneously, implicit criticism of the nudge theory in works of Hungarian social psychologists who emphasize the active participation in the nudge of its target (Ferenc Merei and Laszlo Garai).

The most comprehensive study of real-world nudges to date has shown that they have, on average, a 1.4% impact on the outcome variable. This is 1/6th of what the academic studies predict (8.7%). This is based on a study from UC Berkeley looking at 126 RCTs from two different nudge units.

Behavioral economics concepts 
Conventional economics assumes that all people are both rational and selfish. In practice, this is often not the case, which leads to the failure of traditional models. Behavioral economics studies the biases, tendencies and heuristics that affect the decisions that people make to improve, tweak or overhaul traditional economic theory. It aids in determining whether people make good or bad choices and whether they could be helped to make better choices. It can be applied both before and after a decision is made.

Search heuristics 

Before a decision is made, there needs to be a minimum of two options. Behavioral economics employs search heuristics to explain how a person may evaluate their options. Search heuristics is a school of thought that suggests that when making a choice, it is costly to gain information about options and that methods exist to maximise the utility that one might get from searching for information. While each heuristic is not wholistic in its explanation of the search process alone, a combination of these heuristics may be used in the decision-making process. There are three primary search heuristics.

Satisficing

Satisficing is the idea that there is some minimum requirement from the search and once that has been met, stop searching. Following the satisficing heuristic a person may not necessarily acquire the most optimal product (i.e. the one that would grant them the most utility), but would find one that is "good enough". This heuristic may be problematic if the aspiration level is set at such a level that no products exist that could meet the requirements.

Directed cognition

Directed cognition is a search heuristic in which a person treats each opportunity to research information as their last. Rather than a contingent plan that indicates what will be done based on the results of each search, directed cognition considers only if one more search should be conducted and what alternative should be researched.

Elimination by aspects

Whereas satisficing and directed cognition compare choices, elimination by aspects compares certain qualities. A person using the elimination by aspects heuristic first chooses the quality that they value most in what they are searching for and sets an aspiration level. This may be repeated to refine the search. i.e. identify the second most valued quality and set an aspiration level. Using this heuristic, options will be eliminated as they fail to meet the minimum requirements of the chosen qualities.

Heuristics and cognitive effects 
Outside of searching, behavioral economists and psychologists have identified a number of other heuristics and other cognitive effects that affect people's decision making. Some of these include:

Mental accounting

Mental accounting refers to the propensity to allocate resources for specific purposes. Mental accounting is a behavioral bias that causes one to separate money into different categories known as mental accounts either based on the source or the intention of the money.

Anchoring

Anchoring describes when people have a mental reference point with which they compare results to. For example, a person who anticipates that the weather on a particular day would be raining, but finds that on the day it is actually clear blue skies, would gain more utility from the pleasant weather because they anticipated that it would be bad.

Herd behavior

This is a relatively simple bias that reflects the tendency of people to mimic what everyone else is doing and follow the general consensus. It represents the concept of "wisdom of the crowd".

Framing effects

The framing effect is when individuals are presented with the same set of choices, but the choices are framed in a different manner, and this leads to different choices. In other words, individuals choose differently depending on the way questions are presented to them. People tend to have little control over their susceptibility to the framing effect as often, their choice-making process is based on intuition.

Biases and fallacies 

While heuristics are tactics or mental shortcuts to aid in the decision-making process, people are also affected by a number of biases and fallacies. Behavioral economics identifies a number of these biases that negatively affect decision making such as:

Present bias

Present bias reflects the human tendency to want rewards sooner. It describes people who are more likely to forego a greater payoff in the future in favour of receiving a smaller benefit sooner. An example of this is a smoker who is trying to quit. Although they know that in the future they will suffer health consequences, the immediate gain from the nicotine hit is more favourable to a person affected by present bias. Present bias is commonly split into people who are aware of their present bias (sophisticated) and those who are not (naive).

Gambler's fallacy

The gambler's fallacy stems from law of small numbers. It is when an individual believes that an event that has occurred frequently in the past is less likely to occur in the future, despite the probability remaining constant. For example, if a coin had been flipped three times and turned up heads every single time, a person influenced by the gambler's fallacy would predict that the next one ought to be tails because of the abnormal number of heads flipped in the past, even though the probability of a heads occurring is still 50%.

Hot hand fallacy

The hot hand fallacy is the opposite of the gambler's fallacy. It is when an individual believes that an event that has occurred frequently in the past is more likely to occur again in the future such that the streak will continue. This fallacy is particularly common within sport. For example, if a football team has consistently won the last few games they have participated in, then it is often said that they are 'on form' and thus, it is expected that the football team will maintain their winning streak.

Narrative fallacy

Narrative fallacy refers to when people use narratives to connect the dots between random events to make sense of arbitrary information. The term stems from Nassim Taleb's book The Black Swan: The Impact of the Highly Improbable. Narrative fallacy can be problematic as it can lead to individuals making false cause-effect relationships between events. For example, a startup may get funding because investors are swayed by a narrative that sounds plausible, rather than by a more reasoned analysis of available evidence.

Loss aversion

Loss aversion refers to the tendency to place greater weight on losses compared to equivalent gains. In other words, this means that when an individual receives a loss, this will cause their utility to decline more so than the same-sized gain. This means that they are far more likely to try to assign a higher priority on avoiding losses than making investment gains. As a result, some investors might want a higher payout to compensate for losses. If the high payout is not likely, they might try to avoid losses altogether even if the investment's risk is acceptable from a rational standpoint.

Recency bias

When a person places greater expectation on a particular outcome simply because that outcome had just occurred, that person may be affected by recency bias. To return to the coin flipping example, given that the previous one or two flips were heads, a person affected by recency bias would continue to predict that heads would be flipped.

Confirmation bias

Confirmation bias reflects the tendency to positively favour information this is consistent with one's beliefs, and to negatively favour evidence that is inconsistent with one's beliefs.

Familiarity bias

Familiarity bias simply describes the tendency of people to return to what they know and are comfortable with. Familiarity bias discourages affected people from exploring new options and may limit their ability to find an optimal solution.

Status quo bias

Status quo bias describes the tendency of people to keep things the way they are. It is a particular aversion to change in favor of remaining comfortable with what is known.

Behavioral finance 
Behavioral finance 

is the study of the influence of psychology on the behavior of investors or financial analysts. It assumes that investors are not always rational, have limits to their self-control and are influenced by their own biases. For example, behavioral law and economics scholars studying the growth of financial firms' technological capabilities have attributed decision science to irrational consumer decisions.   It also includes the subsequent effects on the markets. Behavioral Finance attempts to explain the reasoning patterns of investors and measures the influential power of these patterns on the investor's decision making. The central issue in behavioral finance is explaining why market participants make irrational systematic errors contrary to assumption of rational market participants. Such errors affect prices and returns, creating market inefficiencies.

Traditional finance 
The accepted theories of finance are referred to as traditional finance. The foundation of traditional finance is associated with the modern portfolio theory (MPT) and the efficient-market hypothesis (EMH). Modern portfolio theory is a stock or portfolio's expected return, standard deviation, and its correlation with the other stocks or mutual funds held within the portfolio. With these three concepts, an efficient portfolio can be created for any group of stocks or bonds. An efficient portfolio is a group of stocks that has the maximum (highest) expected return given the amount of risk assumed, contains the lowest possible risk for a given expected return. The efficient-market hypothesis states that all information has already been reflected in a security's price or market value, and that the current price of the stock or bond always trades at its fair value. The proponents of the traditional theories believe that "investors should just own the entire market rather than attempting to outperform the market". Behavioral finance has emerged as an alternative to these theories of traditional finance and the behavioral aspects of psychology and sociology are integral catalysts within this field of study.

Evolution 

The foundations of behavioral finance can be traced back over 150 years. Several original books written in the 1800s and early 1900s marked the beginning of the behavioral finance school. Originally published in 1841, MacKay's Extraordinary Popular Delusions and the Madness of Crowds presents a chronological timeline of the various panics and schemes throughout history. This work shows how group behavior applies to the financial markets of today. Le Bon's important work, The Crowd: A Study of the Popular Mind, discusses the role of "crowds" (also known as crowd psychology) and group behavior as they apply to the fields of behavioral finance, social psychology, sociology, and history. Selden's 1912 book Psychology of The Stock Market was one of the first to apply the field of psychology directly to the stock market. This classic discusses the emotional and psychological forces at work on investors and traders in the financial markets. These three works along with several others form the foundation of applying psychology and sociology to the field of finance. The foundation of behavioral finance is an area based on an interdisciplinary approach including scholars from the social sciences and business schools. From the liberal arts perspective, this includes the fields of psychology, sociology, anthropology, economics and behavioral economics. On the business administration side, this covers areas such as management, marketing, finance, technology and accounting.

Critics contend that behavioral finance is more a collection of anomalies than a true branch of finance and that these anomalies are either quickly priced out of the market or explained by appealing to market microstructure arguments. However, individual cognitive biases are distinct from social biases; the former can be averaged out by the market, while the other can create positive feedback loops that drive the market further and further from a "fair price" equilibrium. It is observed that, the problem with the general area of behavioral finance is that it only serves as a complement to general economics. Similarly, for an anomaly to violate market efficiency, an investor must be able to trade against it and earn abnormal profits; this is not the case for many anomalies. A specific example of this criticism appears in some explanations of the equity premium puzzle. It is argued that the cause is entry barriers (both practical and psychological) and that the equity premium should reduce as electronic resources open up the stock market to more traders. In response, others contend that most personal investment funds are managed through superannuation funds, minimizing the effect of these putative entry barriers. In addition, professional investors and fund managers seem to hold more bonds than one would expect given return differentials.

Quantitative behavioral finance 
Quantitative behavioral finance uses mathematical and statistical methodology to understand behavioral biases.

Financial models
Some financial models used in money management and asset valuation incorporate behavioral finance parameters. Examples:
 Thaler's model of price reactions to information, with three phases (underreaction, adjustment, and overreaction), creating a price trend.
 One characteristic of overreaction is that average returns following announcements of good news is lower than following bad news. In other words, overreaction occurs if the market reacts too strongly or for too long to news, thus requiring an adjustment in the opposite direction. As a result, outperforming assets in one period is likely to underperform in the following period. This also applies to customers' irrational purchasing habits.
 The stock image coefficient.

Economic reasoning in animals 
A handful of comparative psychologists have attempted to demonstrate quasi-economic reasoning in non-human animals. Early attempts along these lines focus on the behavior of rats and pigeons. These studies draw on the tenets of comparative psychology, where the main goal is to discover analogs to human behavior in experimentally-tractable non-human animals. They are also methodologically similar to the work of Ferster and Skinner. Methodological similarities aside, early researchers in non-human economics deviate from behaviorism in their terminology. Although such studies are set up primarily in an operant conditioning chamber using food rewards for pecking/bar-pressing behavior, the researchers describe pecking and bar-pressing not in terms of reinforcement and stimulus-response relationships but instead in terms of work, demand, budget, and labor. Recent studies have adopted a slightly different approach, taking a more evolutionary perspective, comparing economic behavior of humans to a species of non-human primate, the capuchin monkey.

Animal studies 
Many early studies of non-human economic reasoning were performed on rats and pigeons in an operant conditioning chamber. These studies looked at things like peck rate (in the case of the pigeon) and bar-pressing rate (in the case of the rat) given certain conditions of reward. Early researchers claim, for example, that response pattern (pecking/bar-pressing rate) is an appropriate analogy to human labor supply. Researchers in this field advocate for the appropriateness of using animal economic behavior to understand the elementary components of human economic behavior. In a paper by Battalio, Green, and Kagel, they write,

Labor supply 
The typical laboratory environment to study labor supply in pigeons is set up as follows. Pigeons are first deprived of food. Since the animals become hungry, food becomes highly desired. The pigeons are then placed in an operant conditioning chamber and through orienting and exploring the environment of the chamber they discover that by pecking a small disk located on one side of the chamber, food is delivered to them. In effect, pecking behavior becomes reinforced, as it is associated with food. Before long, the pigeon pecks at the disk (or stimulus) regularly.

In this circumstance, the pigeon is said to "work" for the food by pecking. The food, then, is thought of as the currency. The value of the currency can be adjusted in several ways, including the amount of food delivered, the rate of food delivery and the type of food delivered (some foods are more desirable than others).

Economic behavior similar to that observed in humans is discovered when the hungry pigeons stop working/work less when the reward is reduced. Researchers argue that this is similar to labor supply behavior in humans. That is, like humans (who, even in need, will only work so much for a given wage), the pigeons demonstrate decreases in pecking (work) when the reward (value) is reduced.

Demand 

In human economics, a typical demand curve has negative slope. This means that as the price of a certain good increase, the amount that consumers are willing and able to purchase decreases. Researchers studying the demand curves of non-human animals, such as rats, also find downward slopes.

Researchers have studied demand in rats in a manner distinct from studying labor supply in pigeons. Specifically, in an operant conditioning chamber containing rats as experimental subjects, we require them to press a bar, instead of pecking a small disk, to receive a reward. The reward can be food (reward pellets), water, or a commodity drink such as cherry cola. Unlike in previous pigeon studies, where the work analog was pecking and the monetary analog was a reward, the work analog in this experiment is bar-pressing. Under these circumstances, the researchers claim that changing the number of bar presses required to obtain a commodity item is analogous to changing the price of a commodity item in human economics.

In effect, results of demand studies in non-human animals show that, as the bar-pressing requirement (cost) increase, the number of times an animal presses the bar equal to or greater than the bar-pressing requirement (payment) decreases.

Applied issues

Intertemporal choice 

Behavioral economics has been applied to intertemporal choice, which is defined as making a decision and having the effects of such decision happening in a different time. Intertemporal choice behavior is largely inconsistent, as exemplified by George Ainslie's hyperbolic discounting—one of the prominently studied observations—and further developed by David Laibson, Ted O'Donoghue and Matthew Rabin. Hyperbolic discounting describes the tendency to discount outcomes in the near future more than outcomes in the far future. This pattern of discounting is dynamically inconsistent (or time-inconsistent), and therefore inconsistent with basic models of rational choice, since the rate of discount between time t and t+1 will be low at time t-1 when t is the near future, but high at time t when t is the present and time t+1 is the near future.

This pattern can also be explained through models of sub-additive discounting that distinguish the delay and interval of discounting: people are less patient (per-time-unit) over shorter intervals regardless of when they occur.

Behavioral game theory 

Behavioral game theory, invented by Colin Camerer, analyzes interactive strategic decisions and behavior using the methods of game theory, experimental economics, and experimental psychology. Experiments include testing deviations from typical simplifications of economic theory such as the independence axiom and neglect of altruism, fairness, and framing effects. On the positive side, the method has been applied to interactive learning and social preferences. As a research program, the subject is a development of the last three decades.

Artificial intelligence 

Much of the decisions are more and more made either by human beings with the assistance of artificial intelligent machines or wholly made by these machines. Tshilidzi Marwala and Evan Hurwitz in their book, studied the utility of behavioral economics in such situations and concluded that these intelligent machines reduce the impact of bounded rational decision making. In particular, they observed that these intelligent machines reduce the degree of information asymmetry in the market, improve decision making and thus making markets more rational.

The use of AI machines in the market in applications such as online trading and decision making has changed major economic theories. Other theories where AI has had impact include in rational choice, rational expectations, game theory, Lewis turning point, portfolio optimization and counterfactual thinking.

Other areas of research 
Other branches of behavioral economics enrich the model of the utility function without implying inconsistency in preferences. Ernst Fehr, Armin Falk, and Rabin studied fairness, inequity aversion and reciprocal altruism, weakening the neoclassical assumption of perfect selfishness. This work is particularly applicable to wage setting. The work on "intrinsic motivation by Uri Gneezy and Aldo Rustichini and "identity" by George Akerlof and Rachel Kranton assumes that agents derive utility from adopting personal and social norms in addition to conditional expected utility. According to Aggarwal, in addition to behavioral deviations from rational equilibrium, markets are also likely to suffer from lagged responses, search costs, externalities of the commons, and other frictions making it difficult to disentangle behavioral effects in market behavior.

"Conditional expected utility" is a form of reasoning where the individual has an illusion of control, and calculates the probabilities of external events and hence their utility as a function of their own action, even when they have no causal ability to affect those external events.

Behavioral economics caught on among the general public with the success of books such as Dan Ariely's Predictably Irrational. Practitioners of the discipline have studied quasi-public policy topics such as broadband mapping.

Applications for behavioral economics include the modeling of the consumer decision-making process for applications in artificial intelligence and machine learning.  The Silicon Valley-based start-up Singularities is using the AGM postulates proposed by Alchourrón, Gärdenfors, and Makinson—the formalization of the concepts of beliefs and change for rational entities—in a symbolic logic to create a "machine learning and deduction engine that uses the latest data science and big data algorithms in order to generate the content and conditional rules (counterfactuals) that capture customer's behaviors and beliefs."

The University of Pennsylvania's Center for Health Incentives & Behavioral Economics (CHIBE) looks at how behavioral economics can improve health outcomes. CHIBE researchers have found evidence that many behavioral economics principles (incentives, patient and clinician nudges, gamification, loss aversion, and more) can be helpful to encourage vaccine uptake, smoking cessation, medication adherence, and physical activity, for example.

Applications of behavioral economics also exist in other disciplines, for example in the area of supply chain management.

Natural experiments 
From a biological point of view, human behaviors are essentially the same during crises accompanied by stock market crashes and during bubble growth when share prices exceed historic highs. During those periods, most market participants see something new for themselves, and this inevitably induces a stress response in them with accompanying changes in their endocrine profiles and motivations. The result is quantitative and qualitative changes in behavior. This is one example where behavior affecting economics and finance can be observed and variably-contrasted using behavioral economics.

Behavioral economics' usefulness applies beyond environments similar to stock exchanges. Selfish-reasoning, 'adult behaviors', and similar, can be identified within criminal-concealment(s), and legal-deficiencies and neglect of different types can be observed and discovered. Awareness of indirect consequence (or lack of), at least in potential with different experimental models and methods, can be used as well—behavioral economics' potential uses are broad, but its reliability needs scrutiny. Underestimation of the role of novelty as a stressor is the primary shortcoming of current approaches for market research. It is necessary to account for the biologically determined diphasisms of human behavior in everyday low-stress conditions and in response to stressors. Limitations of experimental methods (e.g. randomized control trials) and their use in economics were famously analyzed by Angus Deaton.

Honors and awards

Nobel Prize

1978 - Herbert Simon 
In 1978 Herbert Simon was awarded the Nobel Memorial Prize in Economic Sciences "for his pioneering research into the decision-making process within economic organizations". Simon earned his Bachelor of Arts and his Ph.D. in Political Science from the University of Chicago before going on to teach at Carnegie Tech. Herbert was praised for his work on bounded rationality, a challenge to the assumption that humans are rational actors.

2001 - George Akerlof, Michael Spence, and Joseph Stiglitz 
The Royal Swedish Academy of Sciences stated George Akerlof, Michael Spence and Joseph Stiglitz received the Nobel Memorial Prize in Economic Sciences in 2001 "for their analyses of markets with asymmetric information." Akerlof's work looked into adverse selection, emphasizing the importance of information within markets, while Spence and Stiglitz made insights on signalling and screening, respectively. Their work on markets challenged standard theories within economics.

2002 - Daniel Kahneman and Vernon L. Smith 
In 2002, psychologist Daniel Kahneman and economist Vernon L. Smith were awarded the Nobel Memorial Prize in Economic Sciences. Kahneman was awarded the prize "for having integrated insights from psychological research into economic science, especially concerning human judgment and decision-making under uncertainty", while Smith was awarded the prize "for having established laboratory experiments as a tool in empirical economic analysis, especially in the study of alternative market mechanisms."

2013 - Robert J. Shiller 
In 2013, economist Robert J. Shiller received the Nobel Memorial Prize in Economic Sciences along with Eugene Fama and Lars Peter "for their empirical analysis of asset prices" within the field of behavioral finance, as according to the press release from the Royal Swedish Academy of Sciences. Shiller discovered that one can more accurately predict stock prices in the long-run compared to the short run. He also hypothesized that rational actors cannot be responsible for stock prices in the short-run due to uniquely large fluctuations.

2017 - Richard Thaler 
 In 2017, economist Richard Thaler was awarded the Nobel Memorial Prize in Economic Sciences for "his contributions to behavioral economics and his pioneering work in establishing that people are predictably irrational in ways that defy economic theory." Thaler was especially recognized for presenting inconsistencies in standard Economic theory and for his formulation of mental accounting and liberal paternalism.

Other Awards

1999 - Andrei Shleifer 
The work of Andrei Shleifer focused on behavioral finance and made observations on the limits of the efficient market hypothesis. Shleifer received the 1999 John Bates Clark Medal from the American Economic Association for his work.

2001 - Matthew Rabin 
Matthew Rabin received the "genius" award from the MarArthur Foundation in 2000. The American Economic Association chose Rabin as the recipient of the 2001 John Bates Clark medal. Rabin's awards were given to him primarily on the basis of his work on fairness and reciprocity, and on present bias.

2003 - Sendhil Mullainathan 
Sendhil Mullainathan was the youngest of the chosen MacArthur Fellows in 2002, receiving a fellowship grant of $500,000 in 2003. Mullainathan was praised by the MacArthur Foundation as working on economics and psychology as an aggregate. Mullainathan's research focused on the salaries of executives on Wall Street; he also has looked at the implications of racial discrimination in markets in the United States.

Criticism 
Experimental psychological work by Kahneman and Tversky published in Armen Alchian's 1950 paper "Uncertainty, Evolution, and Economic Theory" and Gary Becker's 1962 paper "Irrational Behavior and Economic Theory", both of which were published in the Journal of Political Economy, provide a justification for standard neoclassical economic analysis. Alchian's 1950 paper uses the logic of natural selection, stochastic processes, probability theory, and several other lines of reasoning to justify many of the results derived from standard supply analysis assuming firms which maximizing their profits, are certain about the future, and have accurate foresight without having to assume any of those things. Becker's 1962 paper shows that downward sloping market demand curves do not actually require an assumption that the consumers in that market are rational, as is claimed by behavioral economists and they also follow from a wide variety of irrational behavior as well. The two papers laid the groundwork for Richard Thaler's work.

Critics of behavioral economics typically stress the rationality of economic agents. A fundamental critique is provided by Maialeh (2019) who argues that no behavioral research can establish an economic theory. Examples provided on this account include pillars of behavioral economics such as satisficing behavior or prospect theory, which are confronted from the neoclassical perspective of utility maximization and expected utility theory respectively. The author shows that behavioral findings are hardly generalizable and that they do not disprove typical mainstream axioms related to rational behavior.

Others, such as the essayist and former trader Nassim Taleb note that cognitive theories, such as prospect theory, are models of decision-making, not generalized economic behavior, and are only applicable to the sort of once-off decision problems presented to experiment participants or survey respondents. Others argue that decision-making models, such as the endowment effect theory, that have been widely accepted by behavioral economists may be erroneously established as a consequence of poor experimental design practices that do not adequately control subject misconceptions.

Despite a great deal of rhetoric, no unified behavioral theory has yet been espoused: behavioral economists have proposed no alternative unified theory of their own to replace neoclassical economics with.

David Gal has argued that many of these issues stem from behavioral economics being too concerned with understanding how behavior deviates from standard economic models rather than with understanding why people behave the way they do. Understanding why behavior occurs is necessary for the creation of generalizable knowledge, the goal of science. He has referred to behavioral economics as a "triumph of marketing" and particularly cited the example of loss aversion.

Traditional economists are skeptical of the experimental and survey-based techniques that behavioral economics uses extensively. Economists typically stress revealed preferences over stated preferences (from surveys) in the determination of economic value. Experiments and surveys are at risk of systemic biases, strategic behavior and lack of incentive compatibility. Some researchers point out that participants of experiments conducted by behavioral economists are not representative enough and drawing broad conclusions on the basis of such experiments is not possible. An acronym WEIRD has been coined in order to describe the studies participants—as those who come from Western, Educated, Industrialized, Rich, and Democratic societies.

Responses 

Matthew Rabin dismisses these criticisms, countering that consistent results typically are obtained in multiple situations and geographies and can produce good theoretical insight. Behavioral economists, however, responded to these criticisms by focusing on field studies rather than lab experiments. Some economists see a fundamental schism between experimental economics and behavioral economics, but prominent behavioral and experimental economists tend to share techniques and approaches in answering common questions. For example, behavioral economists are investigating neuroeconomics, which is entirely experimental and has not been verified in the field.

The epistemological, ontological, and methodological components of behavioral economics are increasingly debated, in particular by historians of economics and economic methodologists.

According to some researchers, when studying the mechanisms that form the basis of decision-making, especially financial decision-making, it is necessary to recognize that most decisions are made under stress because, "Stress is the nonspecific body response to any demands presented to it."

Related Fields

Experimental economics 

Experimental economics is the application of experimental methods, including statistical, econometric, and computational, to study economic questions. Data collected in experiments are used to estimate effect size, test the validity of economic theories, and illuminate market mechanisms. Economic experiments usually use cash to motivate subjects, in order to mimic real-world incentives. Experiments are used to help understand how and why markets and other exchange systems function as they do. Experimental economics have also expanded to understand institutions and the law (experimental law and economics).

A fundamental aspect of the subject is design of experiments.  Experiments may be conducted in the field or in laboratory settings, whether of individual or group behavior.

Variants of the subject outside such formal confines include natural and quasi-natural experiments.

Neuroeconomics 

Neuroeconomics is an interdisciplinary field that seeks to explain human decision making, the ability to process multiple alternatives and to follow a course of action. It studies how economic behavior can shape our understanding of the brain, and how neuroscientific discoveries can constrain and guide models of economics. It combines research methods from neuroscience, experimental and behavioral economics, and cognitive and social psychology. As research into decision-making behavior becomes increasingly computational, it has also incorporated new approaches from theoretical biology, computer science, and mathematics.

Neuroeconomics studies decision making by using a combination of tools from these fields so as to avoid the shortcomings that arise from a single-perspective approach. In mainstream economics, expected utility (EU) and the concept of rational agents are still being used. Many economic behaviors are not fully explained by these models, such as heuristics and framing. Behavioral economics emerged to account for these anomalies by integrating social, cognitive, and emotional factors in understanding economic decisions. Neuroeconomics adds another layer by using neuroscientific methods in understanding the interplay between economic behavior and neural mechanisms. By using tools from various fields, some scholars claim that neuroeconomics offers a more integrative way of understanding decision making.

Evolutionary psychology 

An evolutionary psychology perspective states that many of the perceived limitations in rational choice can be explained as being rational in the context of maximizing biological fitness in the ancestral environment, but not necessarily in the current one. Thus, when living at subsistence level where a reduction of resources may result in death, it may have been rational to place a greater value on preventing losses than on obtaining gains. It may also explain behavioral differences between groups, such as males being less risk-averse than females since males have more variable reproductive success than females. While unsuccessful risk-seeking may limit reproductive success for both sexes, males may potentially increase their reproductive success from successful risk-seeking much more than females can.

Notable people

Economics 

 George Akerlof
 Werner De Bondt
 Paul De Grauwe
 Linda C. Babcock
 Douglas Bernheim
 Colin Camerer
 Armin Falk
 Urs Fischbacher
Tshilidzi Marwala
Susan E. Mayer
 Ernst Fehr
 Simon Gächter
 Uri Gneezy
 David Laibson
 Louis Lévy-Garboua
 John A. List
 George Loewenstein
 Sendhil Mullainathan
 John Quiggin
 Matthew Rabin
 Reinhard Selten
 Herbert A. Simon
 Vernon L. Smith
 Robert Sugden
 Larry Summers
 Richard Thaler
 Abhijit Banerjee
 Esther Duflo
 Kevin Volpp
Katy Milkman

Finance 

 Malcolm Baker
 Nicholas Barberis
 Gunduz Caginalp
 David Hirshleifer
 Andrew Lo
 Michael Mauboussin
 Terrance Odean
 Richard L. Peterson
 Charles Plott
 Robert Prechter
 Hersh Shefrin
 Robert Shiller
 Andrei Shleifer
 Robert Vishny

Psychology 

 George Ainslie
 Dan Ariely
 Ed Diener
 Ward Edwards
 Laszlo Garai
 Gerd Gigerenzer
 Daniel Kahneman
 Ariel Kalil
 George Katona
 Walter Mischel
 Drazen Prelec
 Eldar Shafir
 Paul Slovic
 John Staddon
 Amos Tversky
 Moran Cerf

See also 

 Adaptive market hypothesis
 Animal Spirits (Keynes)
 Behavioralism
 Behavioral operations research
 Behavioral Strategy
 Big Five personality traits
 Confirmation bias
 Cultural economics
 Culture change
 Economic sociology
 Emotional bias
 Fuzzy-trace theory
 Hindsight bias
 Homo reciprocans
 Important publications in behavioral economics
 List of cognitive biases
 Methodological individualism
 Nudge theory
 Observational techniques
 Praxeology
 Priority heuristic
 Regret theory
 Repugnancy costs
 Socioeconomics
 Socionomics

References

Citations

Sources 

 
 
 
 
 
 
  
 
 
 
 
 
 
 
 
 
 
 
 
 
 
  Description 
 
  Chapter-preview links.
 
 
  Description
 
 
 

 
 
The Behavioral Economics Guide
Overview of Behavioral Finance
The Institute of Behavioral Finance
Stirling Behavioural Science Blog, of the Stirling Behavioural Science Centre at University of Stirling
Society for the Advancement of Behavioural Economics
Behavioral Economics: Past, Present, Future – Colin F. Camerer and George Loewenstein
A History of Behavioural Finance / Economics in Published Research: 1944–1988
MSc Behavioural Economics, MSc in Behavioural Economics at the University of Essex
Behavioral Economics of Shipping Business

 
Behavioral finance
Financial economics
Market trends
Microeconomics
Prospect theory